The Cameron Prize for Therapeutics of the University of Edinburgh is awarded by the College of Medicine and Veterinary Medicine to a person who has made any highly important and valuable addition to Practical Therapeutics in the previous five years. The prize, which may be awarded biennially, was founded in 1878 by Dr Andrew Robertson Cameron of Richmond, New South Wales, with a sum of £2,000. The University's senatus academicus may require the prizewinner to deliver one or more lectures or to publish an account on the addition made to Practical Therapeutics.  A list of recipients of the prize dates back to 1879.

Cameron Prize Recipients

See also

 List of medicine awards

References

British lecture series
British science and technology awards
Medical lecture series
Medicine awards
University of Edinburgh